Here 'Tis is an album by jazz saxophonist Lou Donaldson recorded for the Blue Note label in 1961 and performed by Donaldson with organist Baby Face Willette, guitarist Grant Green and drummer  Dave Bailey.

Reception
An AllMusic review by Stephen Thomas Erlewine states: "Here 'Tis is in the front rank of Lou Donaldson records, an exceptionally funky soul-jazz session that finds the saxophonist swinging harder than usual. As he moves from hard bop to soul-jazz, Donaldson reveals a bluesy streak to his playing while keeping the vigorous attack that defined his best bop. Donaldson's playing is among his finest in the soul-jazz vein, but what makes Here 'Tis such an enjoyable session is his interaction with his supporting trio... As support, all three know how to keep a groove gritty and flexible, following Lou's lead and working a swinging beat that keeps flowing, never growing static... Their talent, combined with Donaldson at a peak, results in a terrific record".

Track listing
All compositions by Lou Donaldson except where noted.
 "A Foggy Day" (George Gershwin, Ira Gershwin) - 6:38
 "Here 'Tis" - 9:25
 "Cool Blues" (Charlie Parker) - 6:53
 "Watusi Jump" - 7:32
 "Walk Wid Me" - 8:36
Recorded at the Van Gelder Studio, Englewood Cliffs, NJ on January 23, 1961.

Personnel
Lou Donaldson - alto saxophone
Baby Face Willette - organ
Grant Green - guitar
Dave Bailey - drums

References

Lou Donaldson albums
1961 albums
Blue Note Records albums
Albums produced by Alfred Lion
Albums recorded at Van Gelder Studio